Qaleh-ye Now (also Romanized as Qal‘eh-ye Now, Qal‘eh-i-Nau, and Qal‘eh Now) is a village in Pirakuh Rural District, in the Central District of Jowayin County, Razavi Khorasan Province, Iran. At the 2006 census, its population was 25, in 8 families.

References 

Populated places in Joveyn County